André Almeida Pinto (born 5 October 1989) is a Portuguese professional footballer who plays as a central defender.

Club career
Born in Vila Nova de Gaia, Porto District, Pinto joined FC Porto's youth academy at the age of 9. As a senior, he would be consecutively loaned for the duration of his contract, to C.D. Santa Clara, Vitória de Setúbal, Portimonense S.C. and S.C. Olhanense. He made his Primeira Liga debut with the second club, his first match in the competition being a 0–4 home loss against U.D. Leiria on 13 September 2009 where he featured the full 90 minutes.

Pinto was sold to Super League Greece side Panathinaikos F.C. in summer 2012, making 22 competitive appearances in his first and only campaign. He returned to his homeland in late December 2013, signing with S.C. Braga for three and a half years and being initially assigned to the reserves.

In late April 2017, after being ousted from the first-team squad by manager Jorge Simão and subsequently terminating his contract, Pinto agreed to a four-year deal at Sporting CP with a release clause of €45 million, with the move being made effective on 1 July. During his spell at the Estádio José Alvalade, he played second-fiddle to Sebastián Coates and Jérémy Mathieu.

On 30 August 2019, Pinto joined Al-Fateh SC of the Saudi Professional League on a one-year contract. On 30 December of the following year, the free agent agreed to a short-team deal at S.C. Farense with the option of extending it for another season.

Pinto signed a one-year contract with Romanian club FC Dinamo București in September 2021.

International career
Pinto earned 45 caps for Portugal at youth level, including 12 for the under-21s. He made his debut with the full side on 31 March 2015, being sent off in the 60th minute of a 0–2 friendly defeat against Cape Verde in Estoril after a foul on Héldon.

Career statistics

Club

International

Honours
Braga
Taça de Portugal: 2015–16

Sporting CP
Taça de Portugal: 2018–19
Taça da Liga: 2017–18, 2018–19

Individual
SJPF Young Player of the Month: November 2011
SJPF Segunda Liga Young Player of the Month: February 2009

References

External links

1989 births
Living people
Sportspeople from Vila Nova de Gaia
Portuguese footballers
Association football defenders
Primeira Liga players
Liga Portugal 2 players
FC Porto players
Padroense F.C. players
C.D. Santa Clara players
Vitória F.C. players
Portimonense S.C. players
S.C. Olhanense players
S.C. Braga players
S.C. Braga B players
Sporting CP footballers
S.C. Farense players
Super League Greece players
Panathinaikos F.C. players
Saudi Professional League players
Al-Fateh SC players
Liga I players
FC Dinamo București players
Portugal youth international footballers
Portugal under-21 international footballers
Portugal international footballers
Portuguese expatriate footballers
Expatriate footballers in Greece
Expatriate footballers in Saudi Arabia
Expatriate footballers in Romania
Portuguese expatriate sportspeople in Greece
Portuguese expatriate sportspeople in Saudi Arabia
Portuguese expatriate sportspeople in Romania